Gardnerville Ranchos is a census-designated place in Douglas County, Nevada, United States. As of the 2010 census, the population was 11,312. The area is the namesake for the Gardnerville Ranchos Micropolitan Statistical area which includes other areas of Douglas County.

Geography

Climate
According to the Köppen climate classification, Gardnerville Ranchos has a warm-summer Mediterranean climate (abbreviated Csb).

Demographics

As of the census of 2000, there were 11,054 people, 4,003 households, and 3,146 families living in the CDP. The racial makeup of the CDP was 91.7% White, 0.3% African American, 2.2% Native American, 1.0% Asian, 0.1% Pacific Islander, 2.1% from other races, and 2.6% from two or more races. Hispanic or Latino of any race were 7.5% of the population.

There were 4,003 households, out of which 40.8% had children under the age of 18 living with them, 62.8% were married couples living together, 11.0% had a female householder with no husband present, and 21.4% were non-families. 15.9% of all households were made up of individuals, and 4.9% had someone living alone who was 65 years of age or older. The average household size was 2.75 and the average family size was 3.06.

In the CDP, the population was spread out, with 29.6% under the age of 18, 6.0% from 18 to 24, 29.0% from 25 to 44, 23.5% from 45 to 64, and 11.9% who were 65 years of age or older. The median age was 37 years. For every 100 females, there were 99.8 males. For every 100 females age 18 and over, there were 96.8 males.

The median income for a household in the CDP was $48,795, and the median income for a family was $51,546. Males had a median income of $37,292 versus $26,875 for females. The per capita income for the CDP was $20,856. About 6.4% of families and 7.2% of the population were below the poverty line, including 8.8% of those under age 18 and 3.0% of those age 65 or over.

References

Census-designated places in Nevada
Census-designated places in Douglas County, Nevada
Micropolitan areas of Nevada